Malken Mierzynek was a subcamp of the German concentration camp Stutthof (Sztutowo) near Danzig (Gdańsk)  (now in Poland) during the Third Reich.

Nazi concentration camps in Poland